In doma is the 2009 debut album of Debora Petrina, who composed, arranged, mixed, and produced it in addition to providing vocals, accordion, piano, and keyboards. It was released by A Buzz Supreme-Consorzio Utopia and distributed by Egea. Guests on this album include Elliott Sharp, Amy Kohn and Ascanio Celestini. JAM Magazine voted it as the best debut album in November 2009, and it won the Indie-pop Revelation Prize at MEI's 2009 indie label festival.

In doma was covered by magazines other print including Blow Up, All About Jazz, Il Mucchio, JAM Magazine, Rockerilla, Rumore, Il Manifesto, and Stile. Petrina has also appeared on radio shows such as Battiti and Terzo anello on Rai Radio 3; Demo on Rai Radio 1; and TG2 Mizar on TG2, as well as independent stations such as Radio Popolare,  LifeGate Radio, Radio Capodistria, and Radio Città Futura. Songs from In doma were included on David Byrne's radio show on his monthly playlist three separate times in 2009.

Tracks

Personnel
Debora Petrina - vocals, accordion, piano, Rhodes piano, keyboard, toy piano production, composer, arranger
 Alessandro Fedrigo - acoustic bass, electric bass, vocals
 Gianni Bertoncini - drums, stylophone, vocals
 Emir Bijukic - Kraakdoos in "SMS (Csókolózás lány" and "Pool Story"
 Elliott Sharp - guitar in "Pool Story"
 Amy Kohn - accordion in "Ghost Track"
 Ascanio Celestini - radio announcement in "Asteròide 482"
 Patrizia Laquidara - co-writer of "Fuori Stagione"

References

2009 albums
Indie pop albums by Italian artists